Maryland's 4th congressional district comprises portions of Prince George's County and Montgomery County. The seat is represented by Democrat Glenn Ivey.

The district includes most of the majority-black precincts on the Maryland side of the Washington, D.C. metropolitan area. Following the 2020 redistricting cycle, the district still remains concentrated in Prince George's County, but no longer reaches into Anne Arundel County; it takes over areas in Prince George's County formerly incorporated in District 5, including College Park, Greenbelt, and Beltsville, also taking an area of Montgomery County around Burtonsville. The district has the highest median household income of any majority-black congressional district in the United States. With a Cook Partisan Voting Index rating of D+40, it is the most Democratic district in Maryland.

Voting

Recent elections

1970s

1980s

1990s

2000s

2010s

2020s

Early historical boundaries and population
Maryland's Fourth Congressional District was one of the about 50 original Congressional districts. The First Congress of the United States of America.  When it was organized in 1788 it covered Baltimore, Baltimore County, and Harford County.  According to the 1790 Census, the Fourth District had a population of 53,913, nearly 20% of whom were slaves.

In 1792, the Fourth District was moved to western Maryland, with its eastern boundary being a north to south line running about the midpoint of Frederick County, Maryland.  The new district had a population of 36,026, with less than 10% of the population being slaves. The 1800 Census population was 38,015, and the boundaries remained unchanged in 1802.

List of members representing the district

1789–1835: One seat

1835–1843: Two seats
From 1835 to 1843, two seats were apportioned, elected at-large on a general ticket.

1843–present: One seat

Historical district boundaries

See also

Maryland's congressional districts
List of United States congressional districts

Notes

References

External links
Rep. Anthony Brown's official House of Representatives website

04
1789 establishments in Maryland
Constituencies established in 1789